Arjan Xhumba (born 9 July 1968) is an Albanian retired footballer of Greek origin.

Club career
He made his senior debut for local side Luftëtari in 1987 and left the country after the fall of communism in 1992 to have an extended career in Greece. He also had a spell with Enosis Neon Paralimni in Cyprus.

International career
Xhumba made his debut for Albania in a November 1989 FIFA World Cup qualification match against Poland and earned a total of 48 caps, scoring no goals.

His final international was a February 2003 friendly match against Vietnam.

References

External links

1968 births
Living people
Footballers from Gjirokastër
Albanian footballers
Association football central defenders
Albania international footballers
Luftëtari Gjirokastër players
PAS Giannina F.C. players
Kalamata F.C. players
Iraklis Thessaloniki F.C. players
Enosis Neon Paralimni FC players
Messiniakos F.C. players
Super League Greece players
Cypriot First Division players
Albanian expatriate footballers
Expatriate footballers in Greece
Expatriate footballers in Cyprus
Albanian expatriate sportspeople in Greece
Albanian expatriate sportspeople in Cyprus